Prosopocera alboplagiata is a species of beetle in the family Cerambycidae. It was described by Karl Jordan in 1894. It is known from Sierra Leone and Ghana.

References

Prosopocerini
Beetles described in 1894